Catholic University of Health and Allied Sciences (CUHAS) is a  private university in Mwanza, Tanzania.

References

External links
 

Private universities in Tanzania
Universities in Mwanza